David Glover (24 September 1927 – 16 February 2015) was an English television actor. He appeared in British television series and films The Ipcress File, Funeral in Berlin, Carry On... Follow That Camel, The Avengers, Z-Cars, Priest of Love, The Bill, Edward II, Castles, Dracula and others.

Acting credits

References

External links

1927 births
2015 deaths
English male television actors